Palaemon paucidens is a species of shrimp of the family Palaemonidae. It is found in rivers on the Korean Peninsula and in Japan.

References

Palaemonidae
Crustaceans described in 1844